Chilo luteellus is a species of moth in the family Crambidae described by Victor Motschulsky in 1866. It is found in France, Spain, Italy, Denmark, Hungary, Romania, Bulgaria, Greece, Algeria, Egypt, Transcaspia, Syria, Iran, China, Korea, Japan and the Philippines.

The length of the forewings is 13–18 mm. The ground colour of the forewings varies from brownish yellow to brown, with variable irroration of metallically lustrous scales arranged in longitudinal rows along the veins. The hindwings are silky white to creamy. Adults are on wing from May to August.

The larvae feed on Phragmites communis.

References

Moths described in 1866
Chiloini
Moths of Japan
Moths of Europe
Moths of Asia